Delta Crucis or δ Crucis, also identified as Imai, is a star in the southern constellation of Crux, and is the faintest of the four bright stars that form the prominent asterism known as the Southern Cross. This star has an apparent magnitude of 2.8, and its proper name was adopted by the International Astronomical Union on 10 August 2018.

Nomenclature
δ Crucis (Latinised to Delta Crucis) is the star's Bayer designation.

The International Astronomical Union Working Group on Star Names (WGSN) approved the name Imai for this star on 10 August 2018 and it is in the list of IAU-approved star names.  Imai is the name selected for the star designated Delta Crucis by the Mursi people of modern-day Ethiopia. The star Imai has some significance as when it "ceases to appear in the evening sky at dusk (around the end of August), it is said that the Omo River rises high enough to flatten the imai grass that grows along its banks, and then subsides." The Mursi use a series of southern stars to mark their calendar to track seasonal flooding of the Omo River.

It is sometimes called Pálida (Pale [one]) in Portuguese.

Properties

This star has a stellar classification of B2 IV, making it a subgiant star that is in the process of evolving away from the main sequence and becoming a red giant. Presently it is radiating around 10,000 times the luminosity of the Sun from its outer atmosphere at an effective temperature of 22,570 K, causing it to glow with a blue-white hue. Delta Crucis is a strong candidate Beta Cephei variable.

Delta Crucis is a member of the Lower Centaurus Crux (LCC) component of the Scorpius–Centaurus association, which is an OB association of massive stars that share a common origin and motion through space. This is the nearest OB association to the Sun, with the LCC component having an age in the range of 16–20 million years.

In culture

The Aranda and Luritja people around Hermannsburg, Central Australia named Iritjinga, "The Eagle-hawk", a quadrangular arrangement comprising this star, γ Cru (Gacrux), γ Cen (Muhilfain) and δ Cen (Ma Wei).

δ Cru is represented in the flags of Australia, New Zealand, Samoa and Papua New Guinea as one of the stars comprising the Southern Cross. It is also featured in the flag of Brazil, along with 26 other stars, each of which represents a state. δ Cru represents the state of Minas Gerais.

References

External links
 DELTA CRU

B-type subgiants
Beta Cephei variables
Lower Centaurus Crux

Crux (constellation)
Crucis, Delta
Durchmusterung objects
106490
059747
4656
Imai